Anadiou (Turkish: Görmeli), sometimes Anadhiou, is a largely deserted Turkish Cypriot village in the Paphos District of Cyprus, located 3 kilometres northeast of Fyti, and located 79 kilometres southwest of the capital Nicosia. After 2006, people started moving into the village again.

References

https://cypriot-villages.uk/anadiou-village/

Communities in Paphos District